The 1988 Wimbledon Championships was a tennis tournament played on grass courts at the All England Lawn Tennis and Croquet Club in Wimbledon, London in the United Kingdom. It was the 102nd edition of the Wimbledon Championships and were held from 20 June to 4 July 1988. Due to rain interruptions on Sunday 3 July, the men's final finished on 4 July.

Prize money
The total prize money for 1988 championships was £2,612,126. The winner of the men's title earned £165,000 while the women's singles champion earned £148,500.

* per team

Champions

Seniors

Men's singles

 Stefan Edberg defeated  Boris Becker, 4–6, 7–6(7–2), 6–4, 6–2
 It was Edberg's 3rd career Grand Slam title and his 1st Wimbledon title.

Women's singles

 Steffi Graf defeated  Martina Navratilova, 5–7, 6–2, 6–1
 It was Graf's 4th career Grand Slam title and her 1st Wimbledon title.

Men's doubles

 Ken Flach /  Robert Seguso defeated  John Fitzgerald /  Anders Järryd, 6–4, 2–6, 6–4, 7–6(7–3)
 It was Flach's 5th career Grand Slam title and his 3rd and last Wimbledon title. It was Seguso's 4th and last career Grand Slam title and his 2nd Wimbledon title.

Women's doubles

 Steffi Graf /  Gabriela Sabatini defeated  Larisa Savchenko /  Natasha Zvereva, 6–3, 1–6, 12–10
 It was Graf's 5th career Grand Slam title and her 2nd Wimbledon title. It was Sabatini's 1st career Grand Slam title and her only Wimbledon title.

Mixed doubles

 Sherwood Stewart /  Zina Garrison defeated  Kelly Jones /  Gretchen Magers, 6–1, 7–6(7–3)
 It was Stewart's 5th and last career Grand Slam title and his only Wimbledon title. It was Garrison's 2nd career Grand Slam title and her 1st Wimbledon title.

Juniors

Boys' singles

 Nicolás Pereira defeated  Guillaume Raoux, 7–6(7–4), 6–2

Girls' singles

 Brenda Schultz defeated  Emmanuelle Derly, 7–6(7–5), 6–1

Boys' doubles

 Jason Stoltenberg /  Todd Woodbridge defeated  David Rikl /  Tomáš Zdražila, 6–4, 1–6, 7–5

Girls' doubles

 Jo-Anne Faull /  Rachel McQuillan defeated  Alexia Dechaume /  Emmanuelle Derly, 4–6, 6–2, 6–3

Singles seeds

Men's singles
  Ivan Lendl (semifinals, lost to Boris Becker)
  Mats Wilander (quarterfinals, lost to Miloslav Mečíř)
  Stefan Edberg (champion)
  Pat Cash (quarterfinals, lost to Boris Becker)
  Jimmy Connors (fourth round, lost to Patrik Kühnen)
  Boris Becker (final, lost to Stefan Edberg)
  Henri Leconte (fourth round, lost to Tim Mayotte)
  John McEnroe (second round, lost to Wally Masur)
  Miloslav Mečíř (semifinals, lost to Stefan Edberg)
  Tim Mayotte (quarterfinals, lost to Ivan Lendl)
  Anders Järryd (second round, lost to Jim Grabb)
  Jonas Svensson (third round, lost to Paul Annacone)
  Emilio Sánchez (second round, lost to Petr Korda)
  Andrei Chesnokov (first round, lost to Udo Riglewski)
  Amos Mansdorf (second round, lost to Diego Nargiso)
  Slobodan Živojinović (fourth round, lost to Mats Wilander)

Women's singles
  Steffi Graf (champion)
  Martina Navratilova (final, lost to Steffi Graf)
  Pam Shriver (semifinals, lost to Steffi Graf)
  Chris Evert (semifinals, lost to Martina Navratilova)
  Gabriela Sabatini (fourth round, lost to Zina Garrison)
  Helena Suková (quarterfinals, lost to Chris Evert)
  Manuela Maleeva-Fragnière (first round, lost to Pascale Paradis)
  Natasha Zvereva (fourth round, lost to Rosalyn Fairbank)
  Hana Mandlíková (third round, lost to Anne Minter)
  Lori McNeil (third round, lost to Rosalyn Fairbank)
  Claudia Kohde-Kilsch (withdrew before the tournament began)
  Zina Garrison (quarterfinals, lost to Pam Shriver)
  Larisa Savchenko (fourth round, lost to Martina Navratilova)
  Katerina Maleeva (fourth round, lost to Pam Shriver)
  Sylvia Hanika (third round, lost to Katrina Adams)
  Mary Joe Fernández (fourth round, lost to Steffi Graf)

References

External links
 Official Wimbledon Championships website

 
Wimbledon Championships
Wimbledon Championships
June 1988 sports events in the United Kingdom
July 1988 sports events in the United Kingdom